The 2024 United States Senate election in Missouri will be held on November 5, 2024, to elect a member of the United States Senate to represent the state of Missouri. Incumbent Republican Josh Hawley was first elected in 2018 with 51.4% of the vote, defeating incumbent Democratic senator Claire McCaskill. He is running for re-election to a second term in office.

Republican primary

Candidates

Declared 
 Josh Hawley, incumbent U.S. senator

Democratic primary

Candidates

Declared
December Harmon, member of the Columbia Police Review Board
Lucas Kunce, national security director of the American Economic Liberties Project, retired U.S. Marine Corps officer, and candidate for U.S. Senate in 2022

Potential 
 Quinton Lucas, mayor of Kansas City

General election

Predictions

References

External links 
Official campaign sites
 Josh Hawley (R) for Senate
 Lucas Kunce (D) for Senate

2024
Missouri
United States Senate